Kaputt is the ninth album by Canadian indie rock band Destroyer. It was released on January 25, 2011 by Merge Records and Dead Oceans Records. The album was leaked towards the end of 2010. The vinyl edition of the album features bonus material on side three written largely by frequent Destroyer collaborator Ted Bois. This material is also included in the European CD version of the album credited as 'The Laziest River'.

The album was named as a shortlisted (one of 10) nominee for the 2011 Polaris Music Prize award.

Reception

Kaputt received widespread acclaim from music critics upon its release. At Metacritic, which assigns a normalized rating out of 100 to reviews from mainstream critics, the album received an average score of 84, based on 38 reviews, which indicates "universal acclaim". In a five-star review of the album for The Guardian, Alexis Petridis was complimentary of the album's stylistic similarities and lyrical allusions to 1980s popular culture, writing that Kaputt "swerves accusations of archness or kitsch" because of the strength of its songs. Petridis further stated that the album "feels like an open love letter to a vanished pop era: it's unique and warm and beautiful, as love letters are supposed to be." Laura Snapes of NME called it Daniel Bejar's "finest work to date, and excessive, but irresistibly so."

Pitchfork placed Kaputt second on their list of the Top 50 Albums of 2011. It also placed on year-end best album lists from Uncut (number 31) and Mojo (number 41), among others. In August 2014, Kaputt was placed as number 16 on a list published by Pitchfork of The 100 Best Albums of the Decade So Far (2010–2014). In 2019, they ranked the album at number 22 in their list of "The 200 Best Albums of the 2010s"; editor Jeremy D Larson wrote that "Dan Bejar made a masterpiece out of a comedown, a glassy-eyed look at a world starting to collapse." In the same year, Pitchfork also ranked "Chinatown" at number 86 on its list of the 200 Best Songs of the 2010s.

Track listing

CD and digital version

The European CD version contains "The Laziest River" as a single track after "Song for America".

Vinyl version

Personnel
The following people contributed to Kaputt:

Destroyer
Daniel Bejar – composition, musician
Ted Bois – musician, cover photography
Pete Bourne – musician
Nicolas Bragg – musician
John Collins – musician, engineering, production
Joseph Shabason – musician

Additional personnel
Cady Bean-Smith – design
David Carswell – production
J.P. Carter – trumpet
Sibel Thrasher – musician
Kara Walker – composition

References

External links
 Destroyer at Merge Records

2011 albums
Destroyer (band) albums
Dead Oceans albums
Merge Records albums